This is a list of highways in Ponce, Puerto Rico. The list focuses on major, signed, roads in the municipality of Ponce, Puerto Rico. The list shows local roads, that is, those with both terminuses within the municipality ("intra-municipal" roads), as well as inter-municipal roads.

List of highways

See also

 List of highways in Puerto Rico
 List of streets in Ponce, Puerto Rico

References

External links
 

History of Puerto Rico

Highways
Transportation in Ponce, Puerto Rico